Lime Grove is an unincorporated community in Dixon County, Nebraska, United States.

History
Lime Grove (also historically Limegrove) was named from Lime Creek, which runs through it. A post office was established as Limegrove in 1883, and remained in operation until it was discontinued in 1902.

References

Populated places in Dixon County, Nebraska
Unincorporated communities in Nebraska